The surname Laidler is a surname. Notable people with the surname include:

David Laidler (born 1938), economist and scholar of monetarism
Graham Laidler (1908–1940), cartoonist
Harry W. Laidler (1884–1970), American Socialist writer and politician
Jeremy Laidler (born 1989), Australian rules football player
Jim Laidler, American autism activist and skeptic
Keith J. Laidler (1916–2003), pioneer in chemical kinetics